Avcılar is a village in the Üzümlü District, Erzincan Province, Turkey. The village is populated by Kurds of the Balaban and Lolan tribes and had a population of 155 in 2021.

The hamlets of Balabanlı, Kalınca, Mollakomu and Tanyeriistasyonu are attached to the village.

References 

Villages in Üzümlü District
Kurdish settlements in Erzincan Province